Jewels of Desire is a 1927 silent film directed by Paul Powell and starring Priscilla Dean. It was released through Producers Distributing Corporation.

A print is preserved at the UCLA Film and Television Archive.

Cast
Priscilla Dean - Margarita Solano
John Bowers - Maclyn Mills
Walter Long - Pedro
Luke Cosgrove - Captain Blunt
Syd Crossley - Taxi driver
Ernie Adams - The Rat
Raymond Wells - Spanish Joe
Marie Percivale - Old Indian Woman

References

External links

1927 films
American silent feature films
Films directed by Paul Powell (director)
Films based on short fiction
1920s romance films
American black-and-white films
Producers Distributing Corporation films
1920s American films